is a Japanese animation studio that was established in February 2009.

History
The studio was founded in 2009 by Masaru Nagai, who acts as the company's representative director.

The studio has not been credited in an anime since 2021 which indicates that the studio may be inactive or defunct. Shinya Ueda, an animation producer with the studio from 2014 to 2020, left and took former Hoods staff members (such as production manager and director Ryou Nakamura) to his new studio Staple Entertainment. However, freelance animator Kiyoshi Tateishi, a common collaborator of Hoods Entertainment, lists on his Facebook page his freelancing work experience as "Hoods Entertainment (Staple Entertainment)" after working on Staple Entertainment's first production (Vermeil in Gold), indicating that Staple may be some sort of subsidiary company or spin-off of Hoods.

Works

Television series
The Qwaser of Stigmata (2010)
The Qwaser of Stigmata II (2011)
Manyū Hiken-chō (2011)
Mysterious Girlfriend X (2012)
Fantasista Doll (2013)
BlazBlue Alter Memory (2013, co-produced with teamKG)
If Her Flag Breaks (2014)
A Good Librarian Like a Good Shepherd (2014, co-produced with Felix Film)
Drifters (as Hoods Drifters Studio, 2016)
Märchen Mädchen (2018–2019)
Real Girl (2018–2019)
Val × Love (2019)
Gekidol (2021)

OVA/ONAs
Aki Sora (2009)
Aki Sora ~Yume no Naka~ (2010)
Princess Lover! (hentai, 2010, as Public Enemies)
The Qwaser of Stigmata: Portrait of the Empress (2010)
Mysterious Girlfriend X (2012)
Hori-san to Miyamura-kun (2012)
Kagaku Na Yatsura (2013)
Vanquished Queens (2013–2014)
Rescue Me! (2013)
Ark IX (2013)
If Her Flag Breaks (2014)
A Good Librarian Like a Good Shepherd (2014–2015, co-produced with Felix Film)
Hantsu × Trash (2015–2016)
Senran Kagura: Estival Versus- Shōjo-tachi no Sentaku (2015)
Drifters: Special Edition (2016, as Hoods Drifters Studio)
Drifters (2017–2018, episodes 13–15 of Drifters, as Hoods Drifters Studio)
Alice in Deadly School (2021)

References

External links
 

 
Japanese animation studios
Japanese companies established in 2009
Mass media companies established in 2009
Animation studios in Tokyo
Suginami